is the first single released by Kotoko produced by I've Sound and under the Geneon Entertainment label. "DuDiDuWa*lalala" was used as the ending theme for the anime Tweeny Witches. The single reached number fifteen on the Oricon weekly charts and charted for seven weeks.

Track listing 
覚えてていいよ / Oboetete Ii yo—4:11
Composition: Tomoyuki Nakazawa
Arrangement: Tomoyuki Nakazawa
Lyrics: Kotoko
DuDiDuWa*lalala—5:17
Composition: Atsuhiko Nakatsubo, Kotoko, Johann Strauss II
Arrangement: Atsuhiko Nakatsubo
Lyrics: Kotoko
覚えてていいよ / Oboetete Ii yo (Karaoke) -- 4:10
DuDiDuWa*lalala (Karaoke) - 5:17

References

2004 singles
Kotoko (singer) songs
Song recordings produced by I've Sound
Songs with lyrics by Kotoko (musician)